Arthur Hay may refer to:

 Arthur Hay, 9th Marquess of Tweeddale (1824–1878), Scottish soldier and ornithologist
 Arthur Hay (cricketer) (1873–1945), Australian clergyman and cricketer
 Arthur Hay, 15th Earl of Kinnoull (1935–2013), Scottish surveyor
 Arthur D. Hay (1884–1952), American attorney and judge in Oregon